The Treason Act 1708 (7 Ann c 21) is an Act of the Parliament of Great Britain which harmonised the law of high treason between the former kingdoms of England and Scotland following their union as Great Britain in 1707.

This Act is partly still in force in Great Britain (as of 2018).

Offences
Before the Act was passed, treason in Scotland consisted of "theft in landed men, murder under trust, wilful fire-raising, firing coalheughs, and assassination." Section 1 of the Act abolished these offences and replaced them with the English definition of high treason. The Act also applied the English offence of misprision of treason to Scotland. (However it did not extend petty treason to Scotland.)

The Act also created new offences of treason. It became treason:
to counterfeit the Great Seal of Scotland and other Scottish seals (anywhere in Great Britain), and
to slay the Lords of Session or Lords of Justiciary "sitting in Judgment in the Exercise of their Office within Scotland".

These new offences were similar to existing treasons in England, as in England it was already treason to kill judges or to forge the English seal. (For treason in English law in 1708 and today, see High treason in the United Kingdom.)

Since 1708 treason law in Scotland has generally remained the same as in England. However while the offence of counterfeiting the Seal of Scotland was removed from English treason law in 1861, it is still treason in Scottish law. Also counterfeiting the Great Seal of Great Britain (which was treason under another Act) ceased to be treason in England and became a felony in 1861.

When the Scottish Parliament was established in 1998, treason and misprision of treason were designated as reserved matters, meaning they fall outside its jurisdiction.

Procedure
Section III of the Act required the Scottish courts to try cases of treason and misprision of treason according to English rules of procedure and evidence. This rule was repealed in 1945.

Sections still in force
The Act originally had eleven sections, which were later renumbered one to fourteen. Of the fourteen sections, four survive:
Section 1 brings Scottish law into line with English law in respect of high treason and misprision of treason.
Section 5 made the penalties for high treason and misprision of treason in Scotland the same as in England (for details see Treason Act 1814).
Section 11 makes it treason to kill certain Scottish judges.
Section 12 makes it treason to forge "Her Majesty's Seals appointed by the Twenty-fourth Article of the Union to be kept, used, and continued in Scotland". This list of seals includes the Great Seal of Scotland. (This section was repealed in England and Wales in 1830.)

Other treason legislation in 1708
Another Act, 7 Ann. c. 25, amended the Coin Act 1696 (which made it treason to counterfeit coins).

See also
High treason in the United Kingdom
Treason Act 1743
Treason (Ireland) Act 1854
Treason Act

References

External links
 

Great Britain Acts of Parliament 1708
Acts of the Parliament of Great Britain concerning Scotland
1708 in Scotland
Treason in the United Kingdom
Scottish criminal law